In geometry, a spring is a surface in the shape of a coiled tube, generated by sweeping a circle about the path of a helix.

Definition
A spring wrapped around the z-axis can be defined parametrically by:

where 

 is the distance from the center of the tube to the center of the helix, 
 is the radius of the tube,
 is the speed of the movement along the z axis (in a right-handed Cartesian coordinate system, positive values create right-handed springs, whereas negative values create left-handed springs),
 is the number of rounds in a spring.

The implicit function in Cartesian coordinates for a spring wrapped around the z-axis, with  = 1 is

The interior volume of the spiral is given by

Other definitions
Note that the previous definition uses a vertical circular cross section. This is not entirely accurate as the tube becomes increasingly distorted as the Torsion increases (ratio of the speed   and the incline of the tube). 

An alternative would be to have a circular cross section in the plane perpendicular to the helix curve. This would be closer to the shape of a physical spring. The mathematics would be much more complicated.

The torus can be viewed as a special case of the spring obtained when the helix degenerates to a circle.

References

See also
Spiral
Helix

Surfaces